Muzaffarnagar Lok Sabha constituency is one of the 80 Lok Sabha (parliamentary) constituencies in the Indian state of Uttar Pradesh.

Assembly segments 
Muzaffarnagar Lok Sabha constituency comprises five Vidhan Sabha (legislative assembly) segments. These are:

Members of Parliament

Elections results

General election 2024

General election 2019

General election 2014

General election 2009

General election 2004

General election 1999

General election 1998

General election 1996

General election 1991

General election 1989

General election 1984

General election 1980

General election 1977

General election 1971

Former PM Chaudhary Charan Singh lost this election from Thakur Vijay Pal Singh who contested as a joint candidate of Congress and Communist Party.

General election 1967

General election 1962

General election 1957

General election 1952

See also
 Muzaffarnagar district
 List of Constituencies of the Lok Sabha

Notes

Lok Sabha constituencies in Uttar Pradesh
Politics of Muzaffarnagar district